Soyuz MS-01 was a 2016 Soyuz spaceflight to the International Space Station. Originally scheduled for launch in June 2016, the mission successfully lifted off from Kazakhstan on 7 July 2016. It transported three members of the Expedition 48 crew to the International Space Station. Soyuz MS-01 is the 130th flight of a Soyuz spacecraft, and the first with the new version Soyuz MS. The crew consisted of a Russian commander, a Japanese flight engineer, and an American flight engineer.

On 6 June 2016, the launch was rescheduled to July 2016 due to flaws in the control system that could affect the docking to the ISS. The spacecraft was successfully docked on 9 July 2016  and returned to Earth on 30 October 2016.

Crew

Backup crew

References 

Crewed Soyuz missions
Spacecraft launched in 2016
2016 in Russia
Spacecraft which reentered in 2016
Spacecraft launched by Soyuz-FG rockets
Fully civilian crewed orbital spaceflights